Liteň is a market town in Beroun District in the Central Bohemian Region of the Czech Republic. It has about 1,200 inhabitants.

Administrative parts
Villages of Běleč, Dolní Vlence and Leč are administrative parts of Liteň.

Geography
It lies in the Hořovice Uplands. Half of the territory lies in the Bohemian Karst Protected Landscape Area.

History
The first written mention of Liteň is from 1195. In the 16th century, it became property of the Wratislaw of Mitrovice family. Liteň was burned down by the Swedish army led by General Johan Banér in 1639, during the Thirty Years' War. In 1648, the Bubna of Litice family acquired Liteň. In the 18th century, Wratislaws of Mitrovice regained Liteň. The village was promoted to a market town in 1838 by Emperor Ferdinand I.

Culture
Festival of Jarmila Novotná is a music festival, which has been held every year in Liteň Castle since 2012.

Sights
The Church of Saints Peter and Paul was originally a Gothic building from the 13th century, rebuilt in tha Baroque style in the 17th century.

The Liteň Castle was built on the site of a former Gothic fortress in 1661 and rebuilt in the 18th century. Today it is privately owned and used for social and cultural purposes and as a hotel. Next to the castle is a castle park.

Notable people
Josef Šebestián Daubek (1842–1922), Czech-Austrian politician and entrepreneur; died here
Bedřich Homola (1887–1943), general
Jarmila Novotná (1907–1994), soprano and actress; lived here

References

External links

Populated places in the Beroun District
Market towns in the Czech Republic